Road 58 is a road in central Iran. It connects Kashan to Delijan and Aligoodarz.

References

External links 

 Iran road map on Young Journalists Club

Roads in Iran